American recording artist Kelly Rowland has embarked on 17 concert tours during her career, ten of which with Destiny's Child (three as a main act, one as a collaborative act, and six as an opening act), and seven of which as a solo artist (two of her own, one as a co-headlining act, three as a collaborative act and one as an opening act). In her seven solo live tours and notable events dates, she has performed as a solo singer in over 128 shows in six continents through twenty-two countries: in Asia (China, Japan, Philippines, Vietnam, Malaysia, Singapore), in Africa (Nigeria, Egypt), in Europe (Germany, United Kingdom, France, Italy, Netherlands, Belgium, Switzerland,  Denmark, Monaco), in North America (United States, Canada and The Bahamas), in South America (Brazil) and in Oceania (Australia, and the US State of Hawaii). Throughout a career spanning 18 years, Rowland has sold over 40 million records as a solo artist with four studio albums, two compilation albums, one box set, two extended plays and forty-three singles, including nineteen as a featured artist and five promotional singles, and a further 60 million records with Destiny's Child. Her work has earned her several awards and nominations, including four Grammy Awards, a Billboard Music Award and a Soul Train Music Award. Rowland has also received a star on the Hollywood Walk of Fame with Destiny's Child, and as a solo artist she has been honored by the American Society of Composers, Authors and Publishers and Essence for her contributions to music. In 2014, Fuse ranked Rowland in their "100 Most Award-Winning Artists" list at number 20.

With Destiny's Child

 1996 – Opening SWV World Tour, as an open act for SWV (New York City, Los Angeles, Chicago and Houston dates)
 1998 – Opening Evolution Tour, as an open act for Boyz II Men, in support of their first studio album Destiny's Child
 1998 – Opening FanMail Tour, as an opening act for TLC, in support of their second studio album Destiny's Child
 1999 – 1999 European Tour, in support of their second studio album The Writing's on the Wall
 1999 – Opening (You Drive Me) Crazy Tour, as an open act for Britney Spears, in support, of their second studio album The Writing's on the Wall (only Honolulu date)
 2000 – Opening Introducing IMx Tour, as an open act for IMx, in support, of their second studio album The Writing's on the Wall
 2000 – Opening Christina Aguilera in Concert, as an open act for Christina Aguilera, in support of their third album Survivor (North America dates)
 2001 – The Total Request Live Tour (also known as MTV's TRL Tour) is a co-headlining tour with Destiny's Child as a main artist, in support of their third album Survivor, featuring American groups, 3LW, Dream, St. Lunatics and American artists Eve and Nelly. Jessica Simpson joined the tour for select dates before venturing off to her own solo tour. Her slot was later taken by City High. The tour ran during the summer of 2001, playing over 30 shows in the United States and Canada. Many dates were cancelled as an outcome of the 9/11. This was the first edition and only edition of the tour.
 2001/2002 – Destiny's Child World Tour in support of their studio album Survivor. For the world tour was released a self-titled DVD in 2003. The video was filmed during their show at Rotterdam, the Netherlands, and contains the music video of the Rowland international top-ten hit "Stole".
 2005 – Destiny Fulfilled... and Lovin' It in support of their fourth studio album Destiny Fulfilled. The live tour visited Asia, Australia and North America with 67 dates. The U.S. leg of the tour grossed approximately $70.8 million according to Billboard magazine and was the highest-grossing tour for either a pop or R&B band since TLC's FanMail Tour. During the last stop of their European tour in Barcelona on June 11, 2005, Kelly Rowland suddenly announced: "This is the last time you would see us on stage as Destiny's Child".

Simply Deeper Tour

The Simply Deeper Tour was her debut concert tour as a solo artist. It was launched in support of her debut solo album Simply Deep (2002). The Simply Deeper Tour only reached Europe. The concert embarked on a seventeen date tour, hitting up seventeen European cities between September 2003 and October 2003. While Rowland enjoyed moderate success in North American countries such as the U.S. and Canada, her album was a commercial success in the European market and was certified gold or platinum in six countries. Simply Deep also peaked in the top twenty within nine European countries, peaking at number one in both the UK and Ireland. Rowland was originally set to embark on her tour at the beginning of April 2003, but pushed the tour back to September 2003 because of fears regarding the ongoing wars with Afghanistan and Iraq. While the tour received limited reviews, the Simply Deeper Tour's London show appeared to be well received. Melisa Tang of the U.K. online entertainment webazine, The Situation, states, "Even though the Hammersmith Apollo was smaller than other venues this girl is probably used to, Kelly had given it her all, and it had certainly paid off. Everyone left the auditorium buzzing with delight, and even I was surprised at how this once shy teenager had blossomed into a strong, confident young woman." Lisa Verrico of The Times had mixed reviews of Rowland's London show. "There's no question that Rowland has an outstanding voice and there were a surprising number of good songs in her set." Verrico acknowledges before claiming, "The snag was that they weren’t as good as DC's best."

Opening acts
 Motley
 Shawn Emanuel featuring Estelle
 Solange

Set list
 "Simply Deep"
 "Love/Hate"
 "Can't Nobody"
 "Dilemma"
 "(Love Lives In) Strange Places"
 "Everytime You Walk Out That Door"
 "Train on a Track"
 "Destiny's Child Medley:
 "Emotion" (contains excerpts from "How Deep Is Your Love")
 "Bootylicious"
 "Make U Wanna Stay"
 "Beyond Imagination"
 "Stole"
 "Past 12" (Encore)

Tour dates

Ms. Kelly Tour

The Ms. Kelly Tour was her second solo concert tour, and the first tour in North America. It was launched in support of her second studio album Ms. Kelly (2007), which had been released three months prior. The tour began on October 30, 2007 in Sacramento, California and ended on December 1, 2007 in Las Vegas. American R&B singer Mario opened for Rowland at selected venues. The tour showcased Rowland performing songs from her albums Simply Deep and Ms. Kelly as well as in-concert surprises from the Destiny's Child repertoire and more.

Opening act
Mario

Tour dates

Supafest 2010

Supafest was an annual music festival tour held in Australia during April. It started in 2010, spreading out to in five major capital cities (Adelaide, Brisbane, Melbourne, Perth, Sydney), though in 2011 the festival was reduced to four shows with the Adelaide leg withdrawn as well as the second show in Sydney. Dubbed as Australia's largest urban music festival, the festival promises to deliver some of the most exciting and leading performers in the urban music world. The festival began in 2010 with an announcement in December 2009 introducing the "Ladies And Gentlemen Tour", scheduled for February 2010 with Ne-Yo, Pitbull, Kelly Rowland and Chris Sorbello. After this was announced the show was renamed into "Jamfest" in February 2010 and was rescheduled for April 2010. Due to a potential legal conflict, the promoters changed the name again to "Supafest". Supafest Australia kicked off in Adelaide, 13 April 2010 and ended in Perth on 18 April 2010. The tours headlining acts were Akon, Kelly Rowland, Jay Sean, Sean Paul, Pitbull and Eve. Each city had separate opening acts. Tickets for the Sydney show on 15 April were quickly sold out. A second show in Sydney on 16 April had been scheduled due to ticket demands. The organisers of the festival expanded the Supafest to one show outside of Australia and tried to place it at Colombo, Sri Lanka but was later cancelled. Since 2010 the lineups have expanded and the structure and locations of the shows have changed to accommodate the crowd figures. During the tour, she performed the songs from her collaborations and third album Here I Am, and her repertoire.

Collaborative acts
Akon
Pitbull
Jay Sean
Eve
DJ Nino Brown	
Chris Sorbello

Tour dates

F.A.M.E. Tour

Rowland embarked on the F.A.M.E. Tour as an opening act of Chris Brown. During it, she performed the songs from her collaborations and third album Here I Am, and her repertoire.

Tour dates

Supafest 2012

During the Supafest 2012 tour, she performed the songs from her collaborations and third album Here I Am, and her repertoire.

Collaborative acts
Chris Brown	
T-Pain	Yes
Ice Cube	
Trey Songz	
Lupe Fiasco	
Big Sean	
Naughty by Nature	
DJ Scratch	
DJ Nino Brown	
Culture Crew	
JessLyn	
Ludacris

Tour dates

Lights Out Tour
The Lights Out Tour was a co-headlining concert tour by American R&B recording artists Kelly Rowland and The-Dream. It was launched in support of Rowland's fourth studio album Talk a Good Game and The-Dream's fifth studio album IV Play. The tour kicked off on May 26, 2013 in Washington, D.C. and ended on June 2, 2013 in Mashantucket. The tour was originally scheduled to have twenty-two shows, but this was later changed to five, after Rowland was forced to cancel many of the shows because she signed on to become a judge on The X Factor US.

Co-headlining act
The-Dream

Tour dates

RNB Fridays Live 2017

During the RNB Fridays Live 2017 tour, in Australia, she performed the songs of her repertoire.

Collaborative acts
Craig David	
Ne-Yo
Sean Paul	
Kelis	
En Vogue	
Mario	
Christina Milian	
Monifah	
Ruff Endz	
Dj Horizon

Set list
 "Like This"
 "Work"
 "Kisses Down Low"
 "Conceited" (new song 2016)
 "Stole"
 "Say My Name"
 "Soldier"
 "Survivor"
 "Independent Women"
 "Cater 2 U"
 "Is This Love" (cover of Bob Marley and the Wailers)
 "Dilemma"
 "Ice"
 "Motivation"
 "When Love Takes Over" (contains excerpts from "Clocks" of Coldplay)

Tour dates

Other concerts and notable live shows

References

Rowland, Kelly
List